Domenico Colombo (1 March 14181496) was a weaver, the father of Italian explorer and navigator Christopher Columbus and Bartholomew Columbus.

Biography 
Domenico was born in 1418. He had three brothers, who were called Franceschino, Giacomo and Bertino.

His father had apprenticed him to the loom at age 11. Domenico, a third-generation master of his craft in Genoa, was also a shopkeeper. His position was secure and respectable in the lower middle class, but he did not have a firm work ethic. He was a poor provider but was generally liked in his community.

In the boisterous, enterprising spirit of Genoa, he worked as a cheese maker, tavern keeper and dealer in wool and wine. He married Susanna Fontanarossa. Their firstborn was Cristoforo, in 1451; sons Giovanni Pellegrino, Bartolomeo, Giacomo (also called Diego), and daughter Bianchinetta were born after.

When he was found in financial difficulty, he was helped economically by Christopher. Forsaking the loom, two of his sons – Bartholomew and Christopher – went to the sea.

Domenico's daughter-in-law was Filipa Moniz Perestrelo and his grandsons were Diego Columbus and Ferdinand Columbus. He also had one natural granddaughter, Maria.

References 

1418 births
1496 deaths
15th-century Genoese people
Domenico
15th-century Italian businesspeople
Publicans